Cryptus is a large genus of wasps in the family Ichneumonidae with 182 described species.

References

External links 
 
 
 
 
 Cryptus at insectoid.info

Ichneumonidae genera
Cryptinae